Kush do të bëhet milioner? was the Albanian version of Who Wants to Be a Millionaire?. It was first premiered on December 15, 2008, on RTK 1 with original format. Again, on March 7, 2014, it was again telecasted on a different channel which is RTSH but with risk format. In original format, it was hosted by Veton Ibrahimi, Fehmi Ferati and Agron Llakaj and in risk format, Enkel Demi hosted the show. In 2008-2012, this show was aired only on Monday on 9:00 pm and in 2014, it was aired only on Fridays. It was shown to the audience with 5 seasons.

Seasons 
The first season of this show was telecasted on RTK 1 on 15 December 2008 and ended on 27 April 2009 which was hosted by Veton Ibrahimi. It telecasted 20 episodes then.

The second season was telecasted also on RTK 1 on 27 September 2009 and ended on 7 June 2010 which was hosted by Fehmi Ferati. It telecasted 35 episodes then.

The third season was telecasted also on RTK 1 on 17 September 2010 and ended on 25 July 2011 which was hosted by Agron Llakaj. It telecasted 30 episodes then.

The fourth season was telecasted also on RTK 1 on 12 September 2011 and ended on 30 July 2012 which was also hosted by Agron Llakaj. It telecasted 46 episodes then.

The fourth season was telecasted on RTSH on 7 March 2014 and ended on 6 June 2014 which was hosted by Enkel Demi. It telecasted 15 episodes then.

Lifelines 

 50-50
 Phone-a-Friend (Telefonoi Mikut, Telefono Mikun)
 Ask the Audience (Pyete Audiencėn, Pyet Publikun)
 Switch the Question (Ndërrimi i pyetjes) (Presented in 2014, used in risk format only)

Money Trees

15.12.2008 - 30.07.2012

07.03 - 06.06.2014

Winners

Penultimate prize winners 

 Edgar Çani - €25,000 (April 11, 2011)
 Ervis Bregu - €25,000 (March 2012)

€6,000 winners 

 Enver Petrovci (December 28, 2009)
 Ilir Avdiu (April 26, 2010)

€3,000 winners 

 Agim Doëi (until February 2009)
 Lumnije Ferati (June 7, 2010)

€1,750 winners 

 Julian Deda (December 28, 2009)
 Endrit Bytyqi (May 28, 2012)
 Tedi Ramaj (May 28, 2012)
 Erza Ahmeti (May 28, 2012)
 Sereda Zyriqi (May 28, 2012)
 Fjolla Berbatovci (May 28, 2012)
 Ergi Minga (May 28, 2012)

€850 winners 

 Tom Krypa (May 31, 2010)
 Olisa Bajgora (May 31, 2010)
 Florian Kurti (2011)

€650 winners 

 Neritan Vito (April 2009)
 Erion Sejdijaj (April 2009)

€500 winners 

 Myrteza Dika (February 2010)

€250 winners 

 Alkeda Baxhija (April 2009)

€? winners 

 Thanas Kulo (November 8, 2009)
 Fatos Kryeziu and Donat Qosja (December 28, 2009)
 Altin Goci (December 28, 2009)
 Genti Kavaja (February 8, 2010)

References 

Who Wants to Be a Millionaire?
Albanian television shows
RTSH original programming